Flop Show is an Indian television sitcom that first aired on DD National in 1989. The show was written and directed by satirical humorist Jaspal Bhatti, who also played himself as the main character. His wife Savita Bhatti produced the show and also acted in all the episodes as his wife. The sitcom was a satire on the socio-cultural problems faced by a common Indian at the time. Only 10 episodes of the show were produced.

The show was again telecast on DD National from 19 May 2020 during the lockdown due to coronavirus.

Overview
Flop Show has a distinctive opening sequence. It starts off with a dedication to those whom the specific episode is poking fun at. This is followed by the title song "Flop Show", which mocks the show itself as being misdirected. It features most of the main cast collectively playing musical instruments as a band. H. N. Singh appears as an eye-patch wearing, menacing looking director. The other cast members are dressed variously as a police inspector, a doctor, a peon, etc.

The show was shot completely in Chandigarh with some episodes being shot at Punjab Engineering College (Jaspal Bhatti is an alumnus of that college). The cast remained the same in every episode, although they played different characters as each episode essayed a different story.

Another distinctive aspect of the show was a joke in between the casting credits at the beginning and a satirically reworded popular Hindi film song played at the end of every episode, in the form of a Parody.

Episodes
Following is the complete list of episodes:

Cast

Jaspal Bhatti as himself "Bhattiji"
Savita Bhatti as herself, also known as Preeti Bhatti by everyone and fondly Preeti by her husband. She is often cross towards any women whom Jaspal Bhatti calls as she is afraid as he could marry the girl.
 Vivek Shauq as various characters
 Neena Cheema as various characters
 B. N. Sharma as various characters
 Rajesh Jolly as various characters
 Binny Grover as various characters
 Brijesh Ahuja as various characters
 Devender Mundepi as various characters
 Kishore Mehta as various characters
 Kuldeep Sharma as various characters
 Payal Chaudhary as various characters
 Prem Kakaria as various characters
 Rajinder as various characters
 Ramesh Chadda as various characters
 Ravi Sharma as various characters
 Shyam Juneja as various characters
 Vinod Sharma as various characters
 Arjuna Bhalla as various characters

References

External links
 

DD National original programming
Indian comedy television series
Indian television sitcoms
1989 Indian television series debuts
1990 Indian television series endings
1980s Indian television series